This is a list of Ukrainian football transfers winter 2021–22. Only clubs in 2021–22 Ukrainian Premier League are included. Due to the Russian invasion of Ukraine FIFA allowed players from Ukrainian clubs to sign deals with the teams outside of the country until 30 June 2022. Such transfers must be registered until 7 April 2022, thus extending transfer window until this date.

Ukrainian Premier League

Chornomorets Odesa

In:

Out:

Desna Chernihiv

In:
 
 
 

Out:

Dnipro-1

 
In:

Out:

Dynamo Kyiv

In:

Out:

Inhulets Petrove

In:

Out:

Kolos Kovalivka

In:

Out:

Lviv

In:

Out:

Mariupol

In:

Out:

Metalist 1925 Kharkiv

In:

 

Out:

Mynai

In:

Out:

Oleksandriya

In:

Out:

Rukh Lviv

In:

Out:

Shakhtar Donetsk

In:

Out:

Veres Rivne

In:

Out:

Vorskla Poltava

In:

Out:

Zorya Luhansk

In:

Out:

Ukrainian First League

Ahrobiznes Volochysk

In:

Out:

Alians Lypova Dolyna

In:

Out:

Hirnyk-Sport Horishni Plavni

In:

Out:
 Andriy Klishchuk

Kramatorsk

In:

Out:

Kremin Kremenchuk

In:

Out:

Kryvbas Kryvyi Rih

In:

Out:

Metalist Kharkiv

In:

Out:

Nyva Ternopil

In:

Out:

Obolon Kyiv

In:

Out:

Olimpik Donetsk

In:
 

Out:

Podillya Khmelnytskyi

In:

Out:

Polissya Zhytomyr

In:

Out:

Prykarpattia Ivano-Frankivsk

In:

Out:

Uzhhorod

In:

Out:

VPK-Ahro Shevchenkivka 

In:
 

Out:

Ukrainian Second League

AFSC Kyiv

In:

 
 

Out:

Balkany Zorya

In:

Out:

Bukovyna Chernivtsi

In:

Out:

Chaika Petropavlivska Borshchahivka

In:

 

Out:

Chernihiv

In:

 

Out:

Dinaz Vyshhorod

In:

Out:

Dnipro Cherkasy

In:

Out:

Enerhiya Nova Kakhovka

In:
 

Out:

Epitsentr Dunaivtsi

In:

Out:

Karpaty Halych

In:

Out:

Karpaty Lviv

In:
 

Out:

Krystal Kherson

In:

Out:

Livyi Bereh Kyiv

In:

Out:

LNZ Cherkasy

In:

Out:

Lyubomyr Stavyshche

In:

 

Out:

Metalurh Zaporizhzhia

In:

Out:

MFA Mukachevo

In:

Out:

Mykolaiv

In:

Out:

Nikopol

In:

Out:

Nyva Vinnytsia

In:

Out:

Peremoha Dnipro

In:

Out:

Poltava

In:

Out:

Real Pharma Odesa

In:

Out:

Rubikon Kyiv

In:

Out:

Skoruk Tomakivka

In:

Out:

Sumy

In:

Out:

Tavriya Simferopol
 

In:
 

Out:

Trostianets

In:

Out:

Viktoriya Mykolaivka

In:

Out:

Vovchansk

In:

Out:

Yarud Mariupol

In:

Out:

References

Ukraine
Transfers
2021-22